Jacob Collier (né Moriarty; born 2 August 1994) is an English singer, songwriter, and multi-instrumentalist. His music incorporates a combination of jazz with elements from many other musical genres, and often features extensive use of reharmonisations and close harmony. He is also known for his energetic live performances, in which he often conducts the audience to sing multiple-part harmonies or percussions.

In 2012, his split-screen video covers of popular songs, such as Stevie Wonder's "Don't You Worry 'bout a Thing", began to go viral on YouTube. In 2014, Collier signed with Quincy Jones's management company and began working on his one-man, audio-visual live performance vehicle, designed and built at the MIT Media Lab by Ben Bloomberg.

In 2016, Collier released his debut album, In My Room, which he recorded, arranged, performed and produced himself in the small back room of his family home in Finchley, North London. In 2017, Collier was awarded Grammy Awards for his arrangements of "Flintstones" and "You and I".

In 2018, Collier began working on Djesse, a four-volume, 50-song album featuring more than two dozen artists and ensembles. The first volume, which features the Metropole Orkest, Djesse Vol. 1, was released in December 2018. The second, Djesse Vol. 2, uses more acoustic instrumentation, and was released in July 2019. In 2020, Collier won Grammy Awards for his arrangements of "All Night Long (All Night)" from Djesse Vol. 1 and "Moon River" from Djesse Vol. 2. In 2021, he won a Grammy Award for "He Won't Hold You" from the third volume, Djesse Vol. 3.

Collier is the first British artist to receive a Grammy Award for each of his first four albums.

Early life 
Collier was born on 2 August 1994. He grew up in north London, raised with two younger sisters. His mother, Suzie Collier, is a violinist, conductor, and professor at the Royal Academy of Music's Junior Academy. Collier's maternal grandfather, Derek Collier, was a violinist who also taught at the Royal Academy and performed with orchestras around the world. Jacob has said: "We sing Bach chorales together as family – it's just so much fun." He is partly of Chinese descent, through his maternal grandmother, Lila Wong.

At age 10, Collier portrayed Tiny Tim in the Arthur Allan Seidelman film A Christmas Carol (2004). At the same time, he was also performing as a treble singer in classical roles such as one of the three boys in Mozart's The Magic Flute and Miles in Benjamin Britten's The Turn of the Screw, the latter of which heavily influenced his use and understanding of harmony. Of Britten's harmonic language, he said, "My mind was shattered outwards." He received the ABRSM Gold Medal for the highest mark in the country for his grade eight singing result in 2008.

Collier attended Mill Hill County High School in north London and the Purcell School for Young Musicians in Bushey, Hertfordshire. He briefly studied jazz piano at the Royal Academy.

Career

Early videos 
Collier began uploading homemade, multi-instrumental content to YouTube in 2011, releasing a vocal arrangement of "Pure Imagination" from the 1971 film Willy Wonka and the Chocolate Factory, and in 2013, a multi-instrumental rendition of Stevie Wonder's "Don't You Worry 'bout a Thing". Collier's uploads used split screen, multitrack recordings of Collier singing each of the arrangement's harmonies. These videos gained solid traction, with some videos—such as the aforementioned "Don't You Worry 'bout a Thing" cover—receiving millions of views. His activity caught the attention of Quincy Jones, who flew Collier to the Montreux Jazz Festival where they met with Herbie Hancock.

Around this time, Ben Bloomberg, a PhD student at the MIT Media Lab, contacted Collier regarding the creation and development of musical hardware and software for live performance. Over the following months, he and Collier constructed a "multimedia live experience".

In 2015, Collier launched a live show, touring Europe and the US. The performance featured a circle of musical instruments, with six simultaneous looping stations capable of simultaneous playback, backed by synced real-time 3D-captured video loops, projected onto a screen behind the instruments, courtesy of Louis Mustill and William Young of Artists and Engineers. Central to the show was a custom-built vocal "Harmonizer" instrument that Collier designed and created with Bloomberg, which enabled Collier to perform multi-voice harmonies in real-time. The show debuted at Ronnie Scott's Jazz Club in London. A few weeks later, Collier opened for Hancock and Chick Corea at the 2015 Montreux Jazz Festival.

2015–2018: In My Room, World Tour, and #IHarmU 

In July 2015, Beats by Dr. Dre reached out to Collier to provide the music for 'The Game Starts Here' England Rugby World Cup campaign. Collier recorded an a cappella version of the hymn "Jerusalem" for the commercial, which aired on national television before each England match. 

In late 2015, Collier began preparing his debut album In My Room, after performing with WDR Big Band in a concert in Cologne, Germany. He arranged, recorded and produced the album himself, playing every instrument. He wrote eight of the eleven tunes. He recorded and mixed the album over three months in the music room of his family home. It was mastered by Bernie Grundman, and released on 1 July 2016 through the independent record label Membran Entertainment Group. Following the release, Collier embarked on a one-man world tour including the 2016 Montreux Jazz Festival.

In anticipation of the release, Collier launched the "#IHarmU" campaign through Patreon, where 100 patrons sent him 15-second video clips of melodies, which he harmonised with multiple vocal parts with his multi-screen layout, and uploaded to social media. Collier received more than 130 melodies and donations, including from British jazz artist Jamie Cullum, Ben Folds, Herbie Hancock, and Kevin Olusola of the a cappella group Pentatonix, arranging "White Christmas" for them, which appeared on A Pentatonix Christmas, which won a Contemporary A Cappella Society award.

In February 2016, Collier was featured on Snarky Puppy's album, Family Dinner – Volume 2. On 22 August, Collier took part in a Quincy Jones tribute concert at the BBC Proms in the Royal Albert Hall in London, in which he performed his own orchestral arrangement of his original song "In The Real Early Morning" with the Metropole Orkest, conducted by Jules Buckley, among other songs.

In December 2016, Collier collaborated with 150 students at MIT to produce a 10 December live concert in Kresge Auditorium titled "Imagination Off the Charts", playing alongside orchestral arrangements of his repertoire. This residency was the subject of a documentary film, Imagination Off The Charts, which won a regional Emmy in June 2018.

In February 2017, Collier won two Grammy Awards: Best Arrangement, Instrumental or A Cappella for the Stevie Wonder song "You and I" and Best Arrangement, Instrumental and Vocals for a cover of "Flintstones". One month later he made his US television debut on The Tavis Smiley Show performing a rendition of "You And I" with jazz-gospel a cappella group Take 6. That year Collier recomposed Samsung's signature ringtone, "Over The Horizon", for the new Samsung Galaxy S8/S8+, and was co-producer on two songs from Becca Stevens album, Regina. Collier helped score DreamWorks' film The Boss Baby with composer Hans Zimmer. The following month, Collier performed with Zimmer and Pharrell Williams at Coachella Valley Music and Arts Festival. In April, Collier was a guest on the daily weekday talk show Harry, and a speaker at the annual TED conference in Vancouver, Canada. On 10 November 2017, the album Jazz Loves Disney 2, on which Collier performs a cover of "Under the Sea", was released.

Collier toured internationally for two and a half years (between 1 July 2015 and 18 December 2017), while hosting masterclasses and performances with orchestras and big bands around the world, including the Metropole Orkest. On 9 July, he and Cory Henry performed again with the Metropole Orkest and Jules Buckley at the North Sea Jazz Festival. In December 2017, Collier collaborated with American Pop/R&B singer Tori Kelly to record an a cappella YouTube video cover of the Christmas song "Have Yourself A Merry Little Christmas".

In December 2017, Collier announced that the One-Man-Show's final performance would be in Rome on 18 December 2017. He discussed plans for a second album, to be recorded in 2018.

In July 2018, Collier was one of the surprise guests at Quincy Jones's 85th birthday party celebrations, at the Montreux Jazz Club.

On 19 July, "Jacob Collier and Friends" took the stage for a special concert as part of the BBC Proms at the Royal Albert Hall in London. Collier performed alongside the Metropole Orkest under conductor Jules Buckley, and invited Take 6, Sam Amidon, Becca Stevens, and Maalem Gnawa musician Hamid El Kasri.

2018–present: Djesse 

On , Collier announced a new four-volume, 50-song musical project, entitled Djesse.

Following a one-week residency at MIT, Djesse (Vol. 1) premiered live in Kresge Auditorium on 8 December 2018. The concert featured his performance with the MIT JC Orchestra (composed of MIT and Berklee College musicians), MIT Festival Jazz Ensemble, MIT Vocal Jazz Ensemble, MIT Concert Choir and Chamber Chorus, Rambax MIT (Senegalese drumming ensemble), mother Suzie Collier and other guests from Boston and Los Angeles.

The first single of the Djesse project, "With The Love in My Heart", was released on 2 November 2018. Two further singles, "Ocean Wide, Canyon Deep" and "All Night Long", were released in late November. Djesse Vol. 1 was released in full on 7 December. The volume features collaborations with Voces8, Laura Mvula, Hamid El Kasri, Take 6, and his mother, Suzie Collier. The Metropole Orkest appeared on every track. Collier produced, arranged, and orchestrated the music, in addition to singing and playing various instruments.

In January 2019, Collier began the Djesse World Tour backed by a band that included Portuguese singer and multi-instrumentalist MARO, bassist Robin Mullarkey, and drummer Christian Euman.

On 26 April 2019, Collier released the second single from the album, a cover of The Beatles' song "Here Comes The Sun" in collaboration with Dodie Clark. The third Vol. 2 single was released on 13 June, an a cappella arrangement of "Moon River" by Henry Mancini and Johnny Mercer with over a hundred vocal contributions from family members, mentors, friends, and other collaborators. The fourth and final single from Djesse Vol. 2, "It Don't Matter", featuring vocals of American singer-songwriter JoJo, was released on 5 July.

Djesse Vol. 2 was released on 19 July 2019, featuring cover artwork by Astrig Akseralian and further musical collaborations with Lianne La Havas, Oumou Sangaré, Chris Thile, Sam Amidon, Steve Vai, Kathryn Tickell, Becca Stevens, and MARO.

Djesse Vol. 1 and Vol. 2 each won a Grammy award at the 62nd Annual Grammy Awards, for "All Night Long (feat. Take 6)" and "Moon River".

On 29 November 2019, Collier released the first single from Djesse Vol. 3, "Time Alone With You", in collaboration with Daniel Caesar. The video premiered on YouTube on 5 December. As of 2022, it was Collier's most viewed non-live performance video on the platform.

In November 2019, Collier appeared on Coldplay's eighth studio album, Everyday Life, providing backing vocals for the tracks "Cry, Cry, Cry", "Everyday Life", and "Church".

Collier was scheduled to continue touring in 2020, before the tour was postponed due to the COVID-19 pandemic.

On 25 March 2020, Collier released the second single from Djesse Vol. 3, "In My Bones". Three further singles, "All I Need", "He Won't Hold You", and "Running Outta Love", were released later that year, leading up to the release of the album. Djesse Vol. 3 was released in full on 14 August 2020. The album features collaborations with Jessie Reyez, T-Pain, Kimbra, Tank and the Bangas, Daniel Caesar, Mahalia, Ty Dolla $ign, Kiana Ledé, Tori Kelly, and Rapsody.

In the weeks leading up to and following the release of Djesse Vol. 3, Collier performed songs from the album on various TV and radio shows. This included performances of "All I Need" with Mahalia and Ty Dolla $ign on Jimmy Kimmel Live!, and with Mahalia on Later... with Jools Holland; a performance of "Running Outta Love" with Tori Kelly on The Late Show with Stephen Colbert; and a three-song set for a Tiny Desk Concert, performed from Collier's home due to the COVID-19 pandemic. Later, on 13 January 2021, Collier and Mahalia performed "All I Need" on The Tonight Show Starring Jimmy Fallon. On 26 January 2021, Collier performed "Sleeping On My Dreams" on The Late Late Show with James Corden.

On 20 November 2020, Collier released an a capella arrangement of "The Christmas Song (Chestnuts Roasting on an Open Fire)". A week later, he released the book Songs of Jacob Collier, which includes arrangements for solo piano and voice of 19 of his songs. It was arranged by Collier and June Lee, with editing done by Lee and Nahre Sol.

On 1 January 2021, Collier released a voice memo recording of an original song, "The Sun Is In Your Eyes". A studio recording attempt was disregarded in favour of the original phone recording. Another version of the song premiered in a TED Connects livestream on 10 April 2020.

At the 2021 Grammy Awards, Djesse Vol. 3 was nominated for the Album of the Year, with the award going to Taylor Swift's Folklore; "All I Need" was nominated for the Best R&B Performance; and "He Won’t Hold You" won the Best Arrangement, Instrumental and Vocals. With this award, Collier became the first British artist to win a Grammy Award for each of his first four albums.

On 24 September 2021, Coldplay and BTS released their single "My Universe", to which Collier contributed background vocals. The track would later debut at number one on the Billboard Hot 100 on 4 October 2021. "My Universe" is featured on Coldplay's ninth studio album Music of the Spheres. The album also features the track "Human Heart", which Collier appears on.

At the 2022 Grammy Awards, Collier was nominated in two categories: Best R&B Song for "Good Days" where he featured alongside SZA and Best Arrangement, Instrumental and Vocals for his "Christmas Song".

On 2 May 2022, Collier was the subject of Alan Yentob's BBC One television documentary Imagine...Jacob Collier: In the Room Where It Happens.

On 10 June 2022, Collier released his first new song of 2022, "Never Gonna Be Alone", which features Lizzy McAlpine on vocals, with whom the song was co-written, alongside John Mayer on guitar.
Regarding the track, Collier said "It speaks to my experience of the world as a hugely beautiful and fragile place", adding that the song "has helped me process some of the grief I think we're all feeling for our pasts and futures, in a myriad of different ways".

On 29 September 2022, Collier released his first live album, Piano Ballads (Live From The Djesse World Tour 2022). The album includes 11 covers largely improvised by Collier on stage while performing on his 2022 tour, many of which involve a spontaneous audience choir. While most songs are credited to Collier alone, Alita Moses is featured on the cover of Dancing Queen and Stian Carstensen is featured on the cover of Tennessee Waltz.

Collier collaborated with British rapper Stormzy in 2022 on his album This Is What I Mean. 

Collier has received two nominations across two categories as part of the upcoming 65th Grammy Awards; ‘Best  Arrangement, Instruments And Vocals’ for his single “Never Gonna Be Alone (feat. Lizzy McAlpine & John Mayer)” and ‘Album Of The Year’ for his featured artist, producer, songwriter and engineering contributions to Coldplay’s Music of The Spheres. 

Collier performed a melody of Human Heart and Fix You with Coldplay on Saturday Night Live, Season 48 Episode 12.

Musical style and influences 
Coming from a family of musicians, Collier was introduced to music at a very early age. With the support of his mother, he learned to play various instruments and became acquainted with an array of musical concepts. His recording career began in his family home, in a room filled with instruments, where his mother used to teach violin lessons. There, he recorded himself singing and playing instruments – primarily covers of jazz standards or pop songs – using a split screen recording technique to visualize his vocals, which he uploaded to YouTube. These recordings often featured use of reharmonisation, close harmony, dissonance, microtonality and polyrhythms.

Discography

Studio albums

Live albums

Extended plays

Non-album singles

Guest appearances

Acting and opera credits

Film

Television

Opera

Awards and nominations

Grammy Awards

Jazz FM Awards

MOBO Awards

Notes

References

External links 

  – official site
 

1994 births
21st-century English musicians
English people of Chinese descent
English pop musicians
Grammy Award winners
Living people
Musicians from London
English jazz musicians
English rhythm and blues musicians